August Möbs (8 August 1908 – 4 February 1944) was a German footballer.

He came to Eintracht Frankfurt from VfB Friedberg. For the Eagles Möbs scored loads of goals and reached with Eintracht the final rounds for the German championship in 1932 and 1933. In 1932 he lost with his club in the final match to Bayern Munich. On 4 April 1944, during World War II, Möbs was killed in an allied air raid on the Northern boroughs of Frankfurt.

References

External links 
 August Möbs at eintracht-archiv.de

1908 births
1944 deaths
German footballers
Eintracht Frankfurt players
German civilians killed in World War II
Deaths by airstrike during World War II
Association football midfielders
People from Friedberg, Hesse
Sportspeople from Darmstadt (region)
Footballers from Hesse